Lupita is short for Lupe or shortening Guadalupita, diminutive of Guadalupe. It may refer to:

People
Lupita D'Alessio (born 1954), Mexican singer and actress
Lupita Ferrer (born 1943), Venezuelan actress
Lupita González (born 1989), Mexican racewalker
Lupita Infante, American singer-songwriter 
Lupita Jones (born 1968), Mexican businesswoman, former model and beauty queen
Lupita Nyong'o (born 1983), Kenyan-Mexican actress
Lupita Pallás (1926–1985), Mexican actress and dancer
Lupita Tovar (1910–2016), Mexican actress

Other uses
La Lupita, Mexican Latin rock band
Lupita dolls, traditional dolls in Mexico
Miss Lupita project, project based in Mexico City

See also
Guadalupe (disambiguation)
Lupe (disambiguation)

Spanish feminine given names